The Kansas Court of Appeals is the intermediate-level appellate court for the U.S. state of Kansas.

History
The Kansas Legislature created the first Kansas Court of Appeals in 1895, to help the Kansas Supreme Court with an increasingly heavy caseload. The original statute that created the court contained a sunset provision that allowed the court to expire in 1901. The Court of Appeals was reestablished permanently in 1977 as a seven-member appellate court—expanded to ten judges in 1987, then later to twelve and then to fourteen.

Jurisdiction
The Court of Appeals hears all appeals from orders of the State Corporation Commission, original actions in habeas corpus, and all appeals from the state district courts in both civil and criminal cases (except those that may be appealed directly to the Kansas Supreme Court).

Procedures
Kansas Court of Appeals judges sit in panels of three at locations throughout the state, but most frequently at the primary courtroom in the Kansas Judicial Center in Topeka.  The court also has the power to review matters en banc.  Each panel typically rules on approximately 30 appeals over a two-day period every month. Decisions of the Court of Appeals are filed weekly, usually on Friday mornings.

There is no right to an appeal from the judgments of the Court of Appeals.  Parties who lose their appeal in the Court of Appeals may petition the Kansas Supreme Court to review the decision, but the justices are not required to do so.

Judges
Court of Appeals judges are appointed to four-year terms by the Governor of Kansas, with confirmation by the Kansas Senate.  Until 2013, the Governor would appoint a justice from a list of qualified individuals submitted to him by the Kansas Supreme Court Nominating Commission.  The judges go through a retention election after their initial appointment.  The chief judge is elected by the members of the court.  Before July 1, 2014, the Kansas Supreme Court appointed the chief judge.

The judges on the court are:

Vacancies and pending nominations

See also 
 Courts of Kansas

References

External links
 Kansas Court of Appeals official homepage

State appellate courts of the United States
Kansas state courts
1895 establishments in Kansas
1901 disestablishments in Kansas
1977 establishments in Kansas
Courts and tribunals established in 1895
Courts and tribunals disestablished in 1901
Courts and tribunals established in 1977